Smileyville is an unincorporated community in Marion County, in the U.S. state of Missouri.

History
A post office called Smileyville was established in 1889, and remained in operation until 1901. The community has the name of one Mr. Smiley, a local merchant.

References

Unincorporated communities in Marion County, Missouri
Unincorporated communities in Missouri